Buckeye Trail High School is a public high school in Lore City, Ohio.  It is the only high school in the East Guernsey Local School District.  Their mascot is a Warrior, and the school colors are blue and white.  They are members of the Ohio Valley Athletic Conference.  They used to be members of the Pioneer Valley Conference, but in a controversial move that sparked community outrage, became members of the Inter Valley Conference (IVC) in 2016.

OHSAA State Championships

The girls Basketball team won the state championship in 1979, while the girls volleyball team won state championships in 1989 and 1994. and the Pioneer Valley Conference.

Notable Student Achievements
The 2013-2014 senior Physics class conducted a research and community outreach project for Samsung's "Solve For Tomorrow" contest.  The class of sixteen worked with their teacher and other area educators to investigate the impact of recent drastic increases in hydraulic fracturing on local water quality, and presented their findings at a community forum held at the high school; experts on various aspects of the industry also presented to the community members in attendance. Samsung awarded the school a $20,000 technology grant for that year's best project in the state of Ohio.

References

External links
 District Website

High schools in Guernsey County, Ohio
Public high schools in Ohio